Nephrolepis exaltata, known as the sword fern or  Boston fern, is a species of fern in the family Lomariopsidaceae (sometimes treated in the families Davalliaceae or Oleandraceae, or in its own family, Nephrolepidaceae). It is native to the Americas. It is also known as the Boston swordfern, wild Boston fern, Boston Blue Bell Fern, tuber ladder fern, or fishbone fern.

Description
The pinnae are generally deltoid, as seen in the adjacent picture. The pinnate vein pattern is also visible on these highly compound leaves. The edges appear slightly serrate. The plant can grow both terrestrially and as an epiphyte, linear to lanceolate and glandular. The rachis bears monochrome sprout soups. The sori are rounded. The spores are warty and wrinkled. Nephrolepis exaltata forms an underground rhizome that is slim and tuberous.

The species has erect fronds, but Nephrolepis exaltata 'Bostoniensis' (Boston fern) and 'Teddy Junior' have gracefully arching fronds. This mutation was discovered in a shipment of N. exaltata to Boston from Philadelphia in 1894. Other proposals for the origin of the term Boston fern were documented by David Fairchild, who stated that the term came from Florida pioneer nurseryman John Soar, who sent the plants to his friend in Boston.

Range
The fern is common in humid forests and swamps, especially in northern South America, Mexico, Central America, Florida, the West Indies, Polynesia and Africa. N. exaltata thrives in moist, shady locations and is found frequently in swamps and floodplains. It grows epiphytically on the Sabal palmetto.

Cultivation and uses
Nephrolepis exaltata is a very popular house plant, often grown in hanging baskets or similar conditions. It is a perennial plant hardy in USDA plant hardiness zones 9-11. Although the fern may appear totally dead during periods of frost, it will re-emerge in the spring. In general, the Boston fern thrives in damp, but not soggy, soil that is rich in nutrients. Of the common cultivated ferns, the Boston fern is the most tolerant to drought. The fern is acclimated to humid conditions, so when grown as a house plant, it is necessary to mist the plant when relative humidity falls below around 80%. Although the plant prefers partial shade or full shade outdoors, it doesn't grow in shade when indoors and responds best to bright filtered light. The plant is usually propagated by division of the rooted runners, as named cultivars will not produce true spores. It is safe for pets as it is known to be non-toxic.

Cultivars
A number of cultivars exist: 
 
'Teddy Junior'
'Bostoniensis' 
'Sonata'
'Montana'
'Green Lady'
'Marissa' (a dwarf variety)
'Todeoides'
'Whitmanii Improved'
'Rooseveltii'

The following are recipients of the Royal Horticultural Society's Award of Garden Merit:-
 Nephrolepis exaltata 
 Nephrolepis exaltata 'Bostoniensis'  
 Nephrolepis exaltata 'Elegantissima'

Invasive species
A related species, Nephrolepis cordifolia (Tuberous sword fern), is frequently confused with this sword fern, and is a serious exotic invasive plant, forming dense monocultures.
Nephrolepis exaltata is classified as an invasive alien plant in South Africa. In some provinces it must be eradicated by law. In others, a permit is required to import, possess, grow, breed, move, sell, buy or accept one as a gift.

References

External links

Floridata: Nephrolepis exaltata

exaltata
Ferns of the Americas
House plants
Low light plants